Ionel Fulga (born 17 February 1971) is a Romanian former footballer who played as a midfielder.

Honours
Dinamo București
Divizia A: 1989–90
Steaua București
Divizia A: 1992–93, 1993–94
Fulgerul Bragadiru
Divizia C: 1999–2000

References

1971 births
Living people
Romanian footballers
Romania under-21 international footballers
Association football midfielders
Liga I players
Liga II players
Victoria București players
FC Dinamo București players
FC Inter Sibiu players
FC Rapid București players
FC Steaua București players
AFC Rocar București players
FC Brașov (1936) players
FC Argeș Pitești players
FCM Târgoviște players
FC Astra Giurgiu players